The Fowler Museum at UCLA, commonly known as The Fowler, and formerly Museum of Cultural History and Fowler Museum of Cultural History, is a museum on the campus of the University of California, Los Angeles (UCLA) which explores art and material culture primarily from Africa, Asia and the Pacific, and the Americas, past and present.

The Fowler is generally home to three to six art exhibitions and also acts as a venue for lectures on cultural topics, musical performances, art workshops, family programs, festivals and more. The Fowler is located in the northern part of UCLA's Westwood Campus, adjacent to Royce Hall and Glorya Kaufman Hall.

The museum is operated under the jurisdiction of UCLA School of the Arts and Architecture (UCLA Arts).

History

The museum was established in 1963 by then UCLA Chancellor Franklin D. Murphy as the Museum and Laboratories of Ethnic Arts and Technology. Its first home was in the basement of Haines Hall on the UCLA campus. The goal of this new museum was to consolidate the various collections of non-Western art and artifacts on campus. In addition to active collecting, the museum initiated research projects, fieldwork, exhibitions and publications.

In 1971, the name was changed to the Museum of Cultural History and by 1975, its collections, in numbers and in quality, ranked it among the top four university museums in the country, a stature it retains to the present day.

In 1981, UCLA Chancellor Charles E. Young, along with museum director, Christopher B. Donnan, developed a vision for a new building that would fully exhibit the immense collection. The $22-million structure, designed by architects Arnold C. Savrann and John Carl Warnecke, was funded by both private gifts and state resources. The large facility called the Fowler Museum of Cultural History opened on September 30, 1992, named in recognition of lead support by the Fowler Foundation and the family of collector and inventor Francis E. Fowler Jr., former owner of Southern Comfort. In 1996, Doran H. Ross became the director of the Fowler. In 2006, the name of the museum was formally changed to the Fowler Museum at UCLA.

Fowler at Fifty
In the fall of 2013, the museum launched its fiftieth anniversary celebration with a night of festivities and the opening of eight special exhibitions from its global collections. The eight exhibitions, which ran through winter and spring of 2014, were:
From the Sepik River to Los Angeles: Art in Migration
Double Fortune, Double Trouble: Art for Twins among the Yorùbá
Powerful Bodies: Zulu Arts of Personal Adornment
Māori Cloaks, Māori Voices
The Peruvian Four-Selvaged Cloth: Ancient Threads/New Directions
New World Wunderkammer: A Project by Amalia Mesa-Bains
Chupícuaro: The Natalie Wood Gift of Ancient Mexican Ceramics
From X to Why: A Museum Takes Shape
In addition to these exhibitions, the Fowler also exhibited new and promised gifts of art inside the rotating Fowler in Focus gallery, and presented Walk among Worlds, an installation by artist Máximo González, composed of thousands of beach ball globes.

Collections
The Fowler's collections comprise more than 120,000 art and ethnographic and 600,000 archaeological objects representing ancient, traditional, and contemporary cultures of Africa, Native and Latin America, and Asia and the Pacific. From Yoruba beaded arts of Southern Nigeria, to pre-Columbian ceramic vessels of Peru, to elaborate batik textiles of Indonesia and the vibrant papier-mâché sculptures of Mexico, the Fowler's collections offer a comprehensive resource for exhibitions and scholarship central to the museum's mandate.

The majority of the Fowler's holdings have been acquired via the generosity of individuals — researchers, scholars, and dedicated collectors — who have enabled the Fowler to build its world-class collections. The Sir Henry Wellcome Collection of 30,000 objects, assembled early in the 20th century by Sir Henry Wellcome and given to the museum in 1965, forms the core of its African and Pacific holdings and represents the single largest gift. More than 15,000 textiles trace the history of cloth over two millennia and across five continents. 

Objects from the Fowler Family Silver Collection include 400 works representing 16th- through 19th-century Europe and the United States. Among these are vessels from the renowned workshops of Paul de Lamerie, Karl Fabergé, and Paul Revere. In 1969, Hollywood actress Natalie Wood donated a remarkable collection of ancient Chupícuaro Mexican ceramics to the Fowler Museum. In 2013, the Fowler Museum received several gifts in honor of its fiftieth anniversity. One gift was estimated to be worth around $14 million, from collector and Silicon Valley pioneer Jay Last and his wife, Deborah. As reported by the Los Angeles Times, the gift consisted of 92 wood and ivory objects from the Lega people of the Democratic Republic of Congo.

Most of the holdings have been collected in the field and systematically documented, providing essential contextual information. Maintaining geographical scope and artistic variety and building on existing strengths continue to be guiding principles in acquisitions decisions. For example, as the museum augments its programming to meet the interests of the city's growing Latin American population, collection activities in this area have increased. An exceptional collection of more than 900 Mexican works was donated in 1997 by the Daniel Family and includes magnificent ceramic Trees of Life, Day of the Dead figurines, and masks from Metepec, Oaxaca, Michoacan, Jalisco, Puebla, and Guanajuato.

Public programs
Offered throughout the year, the Fowler's public programs are designed to reflect and complement its dynamic exhibition program, as well as highlight the museum's world-renowned collection of art from Africa, Asia and the Pacific, and the Americas. Public programs at the Fowler Museum are typically free and open to the public, unless otherwise noted.

Conversations and lectures
Current and ongoing exhibitions provide the starting point for programming that touches upon scholarly as well as general interest topics. The signature series, Fowler OutSpoken, features speakers in a lecture, conversation, or panel format, and provides audiences with access to emerging and established artists, curators, scholars, performers, and other cultural figures.

Concert and performances
The Fowler offers educational and entertaining events throughout the year showcasing world music and performances by local and international artists. Fowler Out Loud is the museum's performance series that takes place on Thursday nights throughout the academic school year and features international music, dance, poetry, theater, and performance art by UCLA students.

Events and tours
From artist walkthroughs to monthly Culture Fix gallery chats, the Fowler offers numerous opportunities to engage with its exhibitions. In-depth study programs and the museum's signature Fowler on the Town series feature site visits to places of interest in Los Angeles and surrounding areas.

Film screenings and workshops
The Fowler presents film screenings throughout the year. The Fowler offers documentaries and features that relate to current exhibitions. Cooking programs, hands-on demonstrations, and dance and yoga are offered on occasion.

Education
The primary mission of the Fowler's Education Department is to strengthen global arts and humanities education by helping to increase understanding of our world's cultural and artistic traditions.

School Visit Program

The Fowler Museum invites K-12 students to experience global arts during self-guided and guided tours. This program serves students of all ages and abilities.

Professional Development Opportunities

The Fowler Museum also presents diverse professional development offerings and resources for teachers, including curricular materials, professional development workshops, and intensive Teacher Institutes.

University Programs

A dynamic center for research and dialogue, the Fowler Museum serves as a cultural gateway linking UCLA to the world beyond. The Fowler Museum's university programs offer many opportunities for UCLA faculty, staff, and students to engage with global arts. Such programs range from student internships, to interdisciplinary class visits, to student-led performances.

Family Programs

Family programs at the Fowler Museum are designed to encourage families of all types to slow down, look closely at original works of art, and work together to engage with global arts.

Exhibitions
Intersections: World Arts, Local Lives
Reflecting Culture: The Francis E. Fowler, Jr. Collection of Silver
Plus several changing exhibitions
 Continental Rifts: Contemporary Time-based Works of Africa, 2009

Selected collection highlights

Leadership
Marla C. Berns has served as the director of the Fowler Museum at UCLA since 2001. Previously, Doran H. Ross, who succeeded Christopher B. Donnan (1981-1996), served as the museum director from 1996 to 2001. One of the most significant initiatives that Berns has launched as director came to fruition in 2006 with the opening of Intersections: World Arts, Local Lives, the museum's first long-term exhibition of highlights from its renowned permanent collection. The exhibition features a unique thematic and cross-cultural approach and incorporates a wide range of technologies, and has become a staple for K-12 and college-level multicultural education in the Los Angeles area, as well as a favorite stop for general museum visitors interested in world arts.

In addition to continuing the Fowler's pioneering work in the presentation of global arts and cultures, Berns has encouraged the presentation of the work of contemporary artists in exhibitions that speak to both the ongoing dynamism of world cultures and to the resonances between contemporary art and traditional practices. To that end, the Fowler has presented several much-praised solo exhibitions, including the work of the celebrated Ghanaian artist El Anatsui (2007), Cuban-born artist José Bedia (2011), San Francisco-based performance and photo-conceptual artist Allan deSouza (2011), and the riotous Soundsuits of Nick Cave (2010), one of the Fowler's most popular exhibitions to date.

In 2007, Berns' position was endowed by a $1 million donation from Los Angeles philanthropists Shirley and Ralph Shapiro in recognition of her outstanding contributions to UCLA and the community. In 2013, Berns received the medal of Chevalier of the Order of Arts and Letters of the French Republic in a ceremony conducted by Stéphane Martin, president of the Quai Branly Museum. The ceremony took place at the Quai Branly Museum in Paris on Tues., Nov 12, at the opening of Secrets d'ivoire: L'art des Lega d'Afrique centrale, an exhibition of the Fowler Museum's unparalleled collection of African artwork by the Lega peoples of the Democratic Republic of the Congo, which was donated to the Fowler by collectors Jay T. and Deborah R. Last.

References

External links
Fowler Museum Website
Fowler Museum Facebook Page
Fowler Museum Overview of Collections
Fowler Museum Collections Online

Museums in Los Angeles
University of California, Los Angeles buildings and structures
University museums in California
Ethnographic museums in California
Art museums and galleries in California
Art museums established in 1963
1963 establishments in California
Pre-Columbian art museums in the United States
Asian art museums in the United States
Mesoamerican art museums in the United States
African art museums in the United States